GSC 03949-00967 is a G-type main-sequence star about 1190 light-years away. It is older than the Sun, yet is enriched by heavy elements compared to the Sun, having 160% of solar abundance.

Planetary system
In 2011 a transiting hot Jupiter planet TrES-5  was detected. The host star was one of the faintest stars to which a planetary companion was detected by the transit method at the time of discovery.

An additional planet on a 4-day orbit in the system was suspected since 2018, but refuted in 2021. Another object on a wide orbit, either star or planet, is still suspected.

References

Cygnus (constellation)
G-type main-sequence stars
Planetary systems with one confirmed planet
Planetary transit variables
J20205324+5926556